Hardcore is a 2004 Greek drama film directed by Dennis Iliadis and produced by Fenia Cossovitsa, Dennis Iliadis, Iraklis Mavroidis. The film stars Katerina Tsavalou, Danae Skiadi, Ioannis Papazisis, Omiros Poulakis and Andreas Marianos in the lead roles.

Story
Leaving behind a hard life with their families, two young girls end up in a brothel, fall in love and support one another against the adversities and violence of the night.

Cast
 Katerina Tsavalou as Martha
 Danae Skiadi as Nandia
 Ioannis Papazisis as Argyris
 Omiros Poulakis as Miltos
 Andreas Marianos as Boss
 Dimitris Liolios as Sentimental
 Konstadinos Avarikiotis as Sfyrihtras (Whistle)
 Yannis Stankoglou as Zois 
 Antonis Peratikos
 Stelios Christoforidis
 Yannis Stefopoulos as Martha's Customer
 Vyzantia Guy Pyriohou as Maria
 Pigi Roumani as Twin
 Venia Roumani as Twin
 Konstantinos Markoulakis as himself
 Alexandros Mitsopoulos as man in the party

References

External links
 
 

2000s Greek-language films
2004 films
2004 drama films
Greek drama films
Greek LGBT-related films
2004 directorial debut films
Films directed by Dennis Iliadis
Films about prostitution in Greece